Nepenthes alba is a tropical pitcher plant endemic to Peninsular Malaysia. The specific epithet alba is derived from the Latin word albus, meaning "white", and refers to the colour of the upper pitchers.

References

 McPherson, S. 2009. Nepenthes alba and Nepenthes gracillima. Carnivorous Plant Newsletter 38(4): 102–106.
 McPherson, S.R. & A. Robinson 2012. Field Guide to the Pitcher Plants of Peninsular Malaysia and Indochina. Redfern Natural History Productions, Poole.
 Nepenthes alba and Nepenthes gracillima by Stewart McPherson

  Meimberg, H. 2002. Molekular-systematische Untersuchungen an den Familien Nepenthaceae und Ancistrocladaceae sowie verwandter Taxa aus der Unterklasse Caryophyllidae s. l.. Ph.D. thesis, Ludwig Maximilian University of Munich, Munich. 
 Meimberg, H. & G. Heubl 2006. Introduction of a nuclear marker for phylogenetic analysis of Nepenthaceae. Plant Biology 8(6): 831–840. 
 Meimberg, H., S. Thalhammer, A. Brachmann & G. Heubl 2006. Comparative analysis of a translocated copy of the trnK intron in carnivorous family Nepenthaceae. Molecular Phylogenetics and Evolution 39(2): 478–490.

External links
Photographs of N. alba at the Carnivorous Plant Photofinder

Carnivorous plants of Asia
alba
Endemic flora of Peninsular Malaysia
Plants described in 1924